
Rabbi Professor Anthony Michael "Tony" Bayfield  is a Reform rabbi and former President of the Movement for Reform Judaism, the second largest organisation of synagogues in Britain.

Early life and education

Bayfield was born in 1946 in Ilford, Essex (now in Greater London), the elder son  of Sheila (née Mann) and Ron Bayfield, a head teacher.  

He was educated at the Royal Liberty Grammar School in Romford and Magdalene College, Cambridge. He studied law and had a doctoral place at the Cambridge Institute of Criminology and then moved to the Leo Baeck College to train as a rabbi. He received rabbinic ordination (semichah) in 1972 from rabbis John Rayner, Hugo Gryn and Louis Jacobs.

Career

After ten years as a congregational rabbi at North West Surrey Synagogue, Bayfield became director of the Sternberg Centre for Judaism in Finchley in 1985.  He was head of the Movement for Reform Judaism from 1994 (when the organisation was known as Reform Synagogues of Great Britain) until 2011. From 2011 to 2016 he was President of the organisation.

Honours and awards
Bayfield was awarded a CBE in the 2011 New Year Honours List for services to Reform Judaism.

London's National Portrait Gallery holds a photographic portrait of him by Don McCullin.

Personal life
Tony Bayfield married Linda Rose, a teacher and Jewish educator in 1969; she died in 2003. In 2011, he met Jacqueline Fisher, whom he married in a small ceremony in June 2021.

Bayfield has three children and six grandchildren. His younger daughter, Miriam Berger, received semichah in July 2006 and is a respected rabbi in her own right. 

Bayfield is a member of Finchley Reform Synagogue (FRS).

Publications
Bayfield is a specialist in modern Jewish thought and contemporary Reform Judaism. He also specialises in Jewish-Christian and Jewish-Muslim dialogue and has published quite widely in this area. Bayfield has also written about Christian–Jewish reconciliation.

Works
Prejudice (Jewish responses) (1973). London: Michael Goulston Educational Foundation
Churban: The murder of the Jews of Europe (Jewish responses) (1981). London: Michael Goulston Educational Foundation  
Sinai, Law and Responsible Autonomy: Reform Judaism and the Halakhic Tradition (1993). London: Reform Synagogues of Great Britain 
 (with Sidney Brichto and Eugene Fisher) He Kissed Him and They Wept: Towards a Theology of Jewish-Catholic Partnership (2001). London: SCM Press 
 (with Tony Brayfield and Marcus Braybrooke) Dialogue With a Difference: Manor House Group Experience (1992). London: SCM Press 
"September 11: The Case Against Us All" in Roger Boase (ed.) Islam and Global Dialogue – Religious Pluralism and the Pursuit of Peace (2005), Farnham, Surrey: Ashgate Publishing 
 (with Alan Race and Abdullah Siddiqui, eds.) Beyond the Dysfunctional Family: Jews, Christians and Muslims in Dialogue With Each Other and With Britain (2012) London: CreateSpace 
Being Jewish Today – Confronting the Real Issues (2019). London: Bloomsbury Publishing

Sources
The Movement for Reform Judaism)
 The Guardian)

References

External links

1946 births
Living people
20th-century British rabbis
21st-century British rabbis
Alumni of Leo Baeck College
Alumni of Magdalene College, Cambridge
British Reform rabbis
Christian and Jewish interfaith dialogue
Christian–Islamic–Jewish interfaith dialogue
Commanders of the Order of the British Empire
English Jewish writers
People educated at the Royal Liberty Grammar School
People from Ilford
20th-century English writers
20th-century English male writers
21st-century English writers